Choe Hyeonmu (born 1953), better known by her pen name Choe Yun, is a South Korean writer, translator, and professor of French literature.

Life
Choe Yun was born in Seoul in 1953. She received her Ph.D. from Sogang University, graduating in 1978 and travelling to France, where she received the doctorate de 3ème Cycle de l'Université de Provence D.E.A. in Aix-en-Provence and Marseilles. She made her literary debut at the relatively late age of 40, with the publication of the short story collection There a Petal Silently Falls. After her debut, however, Choe was quickly recognized as one of the most important authors in modern South Korea.

Choe is married to fellow literary translator Patrick Maurus.

Career
Choe Yun's writing merges the psychological impact of political/historical events, including the Gwangju Massacre (1980) and the dictatorship of Park Chung-hee (1961–1979), with fictional techniques.

Choe's works are varied, but typically founded in particular political contexts. The Gray Snowman is told by a young woman on the edges of the 1980s’ dissident movement, and Father’s Surveillance and A Voiceless Window show the pain of families split by the Korean War and the sundering of the nation. Choe, however, keeps her lens firmly fixed on the interior lives of her characters, even as they are stuck in the larger web of history. Choe's narrative style, following the twisted inner world of her characters, is often non-realist. Choe frequently uses memory as one of her themes. Many of her works, including There a Petal Silently Falls (1988), Grey Snowman (1991), and Whisper, Whisper (1993), are semi-autobiographical depictions of the events surrounding the Gwangju Uprising. Her work The Last of Hanako (1994) won the Yi Sang Literary Award.

Choe's work typically addresses the psychological damage created in post-World War II (and particularly post-Korean War) Korea. Choe is notable as one of the first novelists to focus on the impact gender roles have had in modern Korean literature.

Works

Works in translation
 There a Petal Silently Falls: Three Stories by Ch'oe Yun (Columbia University Press, 2008), translated by Bruce Fulton and Ju-Chan Fulton 
 The Last of Hanako (Jimoondang Publishing, 2003)
 "His Father's Keeper" in Korea Journal Vol.32 No.2 Summer 1992 pp. 117~134

Works in Korean (partial)
 You Are No Longer You (1991)
 Whisper, Whisper (1991)
 Grey Snowman (1992)
 There a Petal Falls in Silence (1992)
 There Is No Hanako (1994)
 Winter, Atlantis (1997)
 Mannequin (2003)

Translations
(with Patrick Maurus unless otherwise specified)
 La Place (1994) by Choi In-hoon
 Le Poète by Yi Munyeol
 Le fils de l'homme by Yi Munyeol
 L'autre côté d'un souvenir obscur by Yi Gyun-yeong
 Le prophète by Yi Cheong-jun
 Blessures d'avril by Yi Eoryeong

Awards
 Dong-in Literary Award (1992) - for Gray Snowman
 Yi Sang Literary Award (1994) - for The Last of Hanako

References

External links
An interview with Choe Yun by the Columbia University Press
A review of The Last of Hanako at KTLIT

1953 births
Living people
Sogang University alumni
Academic staff of Sogang University
South Korean writers
South Korean women writers
South Korean expatriates in France